Maby is a surname. Notable people with the surname include:

Graham Maby (born 1952), English bass guitar player
J. Cecil Maby (1902–1971), British biophysicist, dowser, and psychical researcher

See also
Aby (name)
Daby
Mary (name)